is a chain of English conversation schools in Japan and other countries. It was founded by Shane Lipscombe in Chiba Prefecture in 1977. Formerly part of the Saxoncourt Group, it is now owned by the cram school operator Eikoh. , it has 206 branches located all over Japan, and is also present in Taiwan, mainland China, and Vietnam. , it had about 20,000 students throughout Japan.

History
In 2001, after an education ministry panel recommended English education at elementary schools, the company offered courses for Japanese elementary school teachers to prepare them for teaching English to their students.

In 2010, the company was purchased by the cram school operator  because they wanted to move into the teaching of 5th- and 6th-grade students due to the new compulsory English teaching at that age level. At that time, it operated 199 schools in the Kantō region — of which 46 were franchised—and had four subsidiaries: Shane Corporation Japan, Shane Corporation Kita Kanto, Shane Corporation Higashi Kanto, and Shane Corporation Minami Kanto.

Controversies

In March 2017, two teachers filed a suit against the company, claiming wrongful dismissal.

References

External links
  

English conversation schools in Japan
Educational institutions established in 1977
1977 establishments in Japan